Pterostylis anaclasta is a plant in the orchid family Orchidaceae and is endemic to Queensland. It was first formally described in 2010 by David Jones who gave it the name Oligochaetochilus anaclastus. The description was published in The Orchadian from a specimen grown at the Australian National Botanic Gardens from a cutting collected near Eungella Dam. In the same year, Jasmine Janes and Marco Duretto changed the name to Pterostylis anaclasta.

References

anaclasta
Endemic orchids of Australia
Orchids of Queensland
Plants described in 2010
Taxa named by David L. Jones (botanist)